Code#02 Pretty Pretty is the second extended play by South Korean girl group Ladies' Code and their last before the 2014 car crash that killed members EunB and RiSe. It was released on September 6, 2013, through Polaris Entertainment and CJ E&M Music. The album was promoted with three singles. The lead single "Hate You" was released on August 6, 2013. The title track "Pretty Pretty" was released as the second single on September 6, 2013, along with the album. The third and final single "I'm Fine Thank You" was released on September 15, 2014, as a tribute to EunB and RiSe.

Track listing

Charts

Sales and certifications

Release history

References

External links
 
 
 

2013 EPs
Korean-language EPs
Ladies' Code albums